Madhavi is a 2009 Indian Tamil language romantic thriller film directed by Murugas. The film stars Sajith Raj, newcomer Mohana and Ramji, with Nizhalgal Ravi, Rekha, Vadivukkarasi, Maaran and Kavitha playing supporting roles. The film, produced by S. Murugan, had musical score by Rajesh Ramalingam and was released on 25 September 2009. The film was dubbed into Telugu as Droham.

Plot

The film begins with a scared Madhavi (Mohana) running in the street from some rowdies in the middle of the night. She then bumps into Mahesh (Ramji) and tells him about her past.

A few years ago, Madhavi was a carefree young woman who lived in a remote village with her wealthy parents. She befriended Nandha (Sajith Raj) who told her that he was a wealthy businessman in Mumbai and she eventually fell in love with him. Her parents then found her a groom: Mahesh who worked in a software company in Chennai and lived with his parents. Madhavi, who was not keen to marry Mahesh, decided to elope with her boyfriend Nandha and they came to Mumbai. Nandha turned out to be a fraud who had sold many women to a brothel and he did the same to her. In the brothel, Madhavi refused to prostitute herself so she was subjected to physical abuse by the pimps. Madhavi then managed to escape from the brothel.

Back to the present, Mahesh takes her home and he convinces her parents to marry her, and they accept. Two days after the marriage, Nandha enters their house and Madhavi is shocked to see him. Nandha is none other than Mahesh's brother. Nandha's father (Nizhalgal Ravi) hated Nandha for being an irresponsible person whereas his mother (Rekha) loved him and blindly believed him. Nandha challenges Madhavi that he will have sex with her and he stops her first-night on multiple occasions. Thereafter, Madhavi becomes pregnant which came as a great shock to Nandha. Madhavi then exposes the true nature of Nandha to her husband and her parents-in-law. An angry Nandha tries to kill Madhavi but Nandha's mother who was ashamed of her son's criminal activities kills him.

Cast

Production
Murugas, an erstwhile assistant of director P. Vasu, made his directorial debut with Madhavi under the banner of Gmass Creation. Murugas' stint with P. Vasu dates back to Mannan (1992) and has been with the director till Chandramukhi (2005). Sajith Raj was selected to play the lead role while newcomer Mohana was cast to play the heroine. The director said that he has dealt with a love story wherein the girl elopes with her lover. What happens next forms the rest of the story. The crux of the matter is about deceiving, he added. One song of the film was shot in Malaysia.

Soundtrack

The film score and the soundtrack were composed by Rajesh Ramalingam. The soundtrack features 5 tracks with lyrics written by Kabilan and Murugas.

References

2009 films
2000s Tamil-language films
Indian romantic thriller films
2000s romantic thriller films
Films shot in Malaysia